Rhonda DeLong (born 8 August 1965) is a Canadian former cross-country skier who competed in the 1992 Winter Olympics.

Cross-country skiing results
All results are sourced from the International Ski Federation (FIS).

Olympic Games

World Championships

World Cup

Season standings

References

1965 births
Living people
Canadian female cross-country skiers
Olympic cross-country skiers of Canada
Cross-country skiers at the 1992 Winter Olympics